Sadanand Shet Tanavade is an Indian politician who is currently serving as the Bharatiya Janata Party state president of Goa and a former Member of Legislative Assembly in the Goa Legislative Assembly from Thivim.

References

Bharatiya Janata Party politicians from Goa
Year of birth missing (living people)
Living people